Trousdale is an unincorporated community in Lincoln Township, Edwards County, Kansas, United States.

History
The community began when a railroad junction was constructed in 1915. It is named for a Newton, Kansas resident who owned land in the vicinity.  At its peak it boasted a bank (which closed during the Depression), Trousdale Grade School and High School, several retail establishments, and two grain elevators.  A high line was built to the community in 1927 to provide electrical service.

A post office was opened in Trousdale in 1916, and remained in operation until it was discontinued in 1967.

In 2006, the Trousdale Methodist Church, a repair shop/parts store, a grain storage facility, and an unmanned fuel retail outlet were the only businesses in addition to family farming operations that were in Trousdale. However, due to the May 4, 2007 tornado, the Methodist Church was destroyed. A new church has been built on the site of the original church.

Notable people
Bruce DeHaven, special teams coach of the Buffalo Bills, a Trousdale High School graduate.

See also
 Zimmerdale, Kansas in Harvey County - originally named Trousdale

References

Further reading

External links
 Trousdale - Dead towns of Kansas
 Trousdale City Map, EdwardsCounty.org
 USD 351, local school district
 Edwards County maps: Current, Historic, KDOT

Unincorporated communities in Edwards County, Kansas
Unincorporated communities in Kansas